
The following are notable schooner-rigged vessels.

Active schooners

Historical schooners

 A. W. Greely, originally named Donald II
 Ada K. Damon
 Albatross
 
 Alvin Clark
 America
 American Spirit
 La Amistad
 Annie Larsen
 Arbuthnot
 Atlantic
 Benjamin C. Cromwell
 Bertha L. Downs
 Bethune Blackwater Schooner
 Bluenose
 Booya
 Texan schooner Brutus, First Texas Navy
 Casuarina
 Chasseur
 Carroll A. Deering
 City of New York (1885 ship)
 Clipper City
 Columbia
 Cora F. Cressey
 Coverack
 
 Cymric
 Delawana
 
 Diosa del Mar
 
 Dorothea Weber
 Edward M Reed
 Empire Cononley
 Empire Contamar
 
 Endymion
 Enterprize
 Equator
 Esperanto
 Fantome
 Forester
 Fort Chesterfield
 
 Gertrude L. Thebaud
 Golden State
 Governor Ames
 
 , first armed American naval vessel
 Happy Harry
 
 Helen Miller Gould
 Henry Ford
 Henry Roop
 Hesper and Luther Little
 
 Hope Haynes
 Ilsley
 Inca (schooner), 5-masted
 Independence
 Independence, First Texas Navy
 
 Invincible, First Texas Navy
 
 James Postlethwaite
 
 Joffre, shipwreck listed on the American National Register of Historic Places
 Lady Ada
 Liberty First Texas Navy  
 Liverpool Packet
 Lucia A. Simpson
 
 SS Mahratta
 Marie Clarisse ex Archie F. MacKenzie
 Margarethe
 Mary B Mitchell
 
 
 O. H. Brown
 Olad
 Paul Palmer, 5-masted
 Phoenix
 
 
 Postboy
 Pretoria
 Pride of Baltimore
 Reaper
 Rebecca
 Result, in the Ulster Folk and Transport Museum
 River Witham
 Rouse Simmons
 Royalist
 
 San Antonio Second Texas Navy
 San Bernard Second Texas Navy
 San Jacinto Second Texas Navy
 St Helena
 Santa Eulàlia (Catalan Pailebot/schooner, 1919)
 Samuel P. Ely
 Speranța, 2-masted gaff, square topsails
 
 
Tho Pa Ga
 Thomas W. Lawson
 Thomas G. Matteson (New York Pilot Schooner N.Y. 20)
 Tyrronall
 
 Virgen de Covadonga
 Wanderer (slave ship)
 
 Wawona
 Wawaloam
 Westward
 William F. Garms
 
 Wuta
 Wyoming
 
 Zavala, the first steamship of war in the western hemisphere, Second Texas Navy
 Zawisza Czarny I

Fictional schooners
 Dragon, in Iain Lawrence's The Smugglers and The Buccaneers, The High Seas Trilogy
 Ebba, Ker Karraje's pirate schooner in Jules Verne's Facing the Flag
 Ghost, seal-hunting schooner in Jack London's The Sea-Wolf
 Hispaniola, a schooner in Robert Louis Stevenson's Treasure Island
 Kestrel, Revolutionary War privateering topsail schooner, Danelle Harmon's Captain of My Heart, My Lady Pirate, and Wicked at Heart
 Prudence & Apostle 1219, in Iain Lawrence's The Smugglers and The Buccaneers, The High Seas Trilogy
 Ringle, a Baltimore clipper, in Patrick O'Brian's The Commodore and subsequent novels in the Aubrey–Maturin series
 Seaspray, a privately owned topsail schooner belonging to journalist Dan Wells in the Roger Mirams 1960's Australian TV Series "The Adventures of the Seaspray"
 Sweet Judy, in Terry Pratchett's Nation
 Unnamed Schooner, crewed by Chris Kristofferson's character in the song, Highwayman by The Highwaymen.
 "We're Here", in Rudyard Kipling's Captains Courageous
 Unnamed Schooner, claimed to belong to Larry David in HBO's Curb Your Enthusiasm
 Lucretia, Cleopatra Highbourne's schooner in Jimmy Buffett's book A Salty Piece of Land
 Wild Cat, in Arthur Ransome's Swallows and Amazons stories Peter Duck and Missee Lee

See also
 List of tall ships

References

+LIst of schooners

Schooners